Nils Mordt (born 5 December 1983 in Harare, Zimbabwe) is a retired rugby union footballer who played at centre for Saracens and England Sevens.

Mordt is the nephew of South African legend, Ray Mordt.

He played junior rugby at Maidenhead Rugby Football Club, and was part of the U17 National Cup winning Colts side.

On 25 January 2008, Northampton Saints announced that he had signed for the club for the 2008/2009 season from London Irish. Mordt joined Harlequins in 2009. In June 2010, Mordt joined Saracens. He was a replacement as Saracens won their first Premiership title in 2011. He was released by Saracens in 2016.

References

External links
 

White Zimbabwean people
English rugby union players
London Irish players
Harlequin F.C. players
Northampton Saints players
Rugby sevens players at the 2006 Commonwealth Games
Male rugby sevens players
Commonwealth Games silver medallists for England
Sportspeople from Harare
1983 births
Living people
People educated at Claires Court School
England international rugby sevens players
Commonwealth Games medallists in rugby sevens
Commonwealth Games rugby sevens players of England
Medallists at the 2006 Commonwealth Games